iFixit is an American e-commerce and how-to website that sells repair parts and publishes free wiki-like online repair guides for consumer electronics and gadgets. The company also performs product tear-downs of consumer devices. It is a private company in San Luis Obispo, California founded in 2003, spurred by Kyle Wiens not being able to locate an Apple iBook G3 repair manual while the company's founders were attending Cal Poly San Luis Obispo.

Business model 

iFixit has released product tear-downs of new mobile and laptop devices which provide advertising for the company's parts and equipment sales. These tear-downs have been reviewed by PC World, The Mac Observer, NetworkWorld, and other publications.

Co-founder Kyle Wiens has said that he aims to reduce electronic waste by teaching people to repair their own gear, and by offering tools, parts, and a forum to discuss repairs. In 2011, he travelled through Africa with a documentary team to meet a community of electronics technicians who repair and rebuild the world's discarded electronics.

iFixit provides a software as a service platform known as Dozuki to allow others to use iFixit's documentation framework to produce their own documentation. O'Reilly Media's Make and Craft magazines use Dozuki to feature community guides alongside instructions originally written by the staff for the print magazine.

On April 3, 2014 iFixit announced a partnership with Fairphone.

During the COVID-19 pandemic, iFixit and CALPIRG, the California arm of the Public Interest Research Group, worked with hospitals and medical research facilities to gather the largest known database of medical equipment manuals and repair guides to support the healthcare industry during the pandemic.

Reception 
In September 2015, Apple removed the iFixit app from the App Store in reaction to the company's publication of a tear-down of a developer pre-release version of the Apple TV (4th generation) obtained under Apple's Developer Program violating a signed Non-Disclosure Agreement, and accordingly, their developer account was suspended. In response, iFixit says it has worked on improving its mobile site for users to access its services through a mobile browser.

In April 2019, it was revealed that some Oculus Quest and Oculus Rift S devices contain a physical Easter egg reading "Hi iFixit! We See You!", demonstrating that device manufacturers are aware of iFixit.

In March 2022 Samsung announced that they would be collaborating with iFixit to provide a self-repair program and parts store for a range of their electronic devices.

In April 2022 Google announced that they would be partnering with iFixit to provide replacement parts for their Pixel series of smartphones.

See also 
 Consumer Rights Act 2015
Do it yourself
Electronics right to repair
Magnuson–Moss Warranty Act
Repair Café
Right to repair

References 

Knowledge markets
Internet properties established in 2003
Maintenance
Do it yourself
DIY culture
Creative Commons-licensed websites